Route 9A can refer to the following highways:

United States
 Connecticut Route 9A (former)
 Delaware Route 9A
 Florida State Road 9A (Jacksonville)
 Florida State Road 9A (Miami)
 Maine State Route 9A
 Massachusetts Route 9A (former)
Missouri Route 9A (former)
 New Hampshire Route 9A
 New York State Route 9A
 Oklahoma State Highway 9A
 Vermont Route F-9A